The 2019 World Series of Poker was the 50th annual tournament, and took place from May 28 – July 16, 2019 at the Rio All-Suite Hotel & Casino in Las Vegas, Nevada.

There were 90 bracelet events. To celebrate the 50th WSOP there was a $50,000 No Limit Hold'em event as well as the Big 50, a $500 buy-in No Limit Hold'em event with a guaranteed $5 million prize pool and $1 million for the winner. There was also a tournament open only to past WSOP bracelet winners. A short deck tournament was also held for the first time. All No Limit Hold'em events employed the Big Blind Ante format.

The $10,000 No Limit Hold'em Main Event began on July 3 and concluded on July 16. The structure of the Main Event was changed, with players now receiving 60,000 chips at the start of the tournament, up from 50,000 in 2018.

Robert Campbell won two bracelets to earn Player of the Year honors. Daniel Negreanu was originally believed to have won the award for the third time, but it was later found that he was erroneously credited with a cash in an event where he didn't finish in the money. When points for that event were taken away, Negreanu finished third behind Campbell and the 2018 winner, Shaun Deeb.

Event schedule
Source:

Player of the Year
Final standings as of November 4 (end of WSOPE):

Leaders
Note: these statistics not including the 15 WSOPE events.

Main Event
The $10,000 No Limit Hold'em Main Event began on July 3 with the first of three starting flights. The final table of 9 was reached on July 12, with the finalists returning on July 14 before a winner was determined on July 16.

The Main Event attracted 8,569 players, the second-largest field in history after 2006. The winner earned $10,000,000, with 1,286 players finishing in the money. There was a mixup at the money bubble, with Ryan Pochedly originally being credited with bursting the bubble. Several days later, however, it was determined that one elimination had not been taken into account, and Pochedly had actually finished in 1,286th place, therefore making the money.

Three past champions made the money, including Chris Moneymaker who cashed in the Main Event for the first time since winning in 2003. Moneymaker, along with David Oppenheim, was announced as the newest inductees into the Poker Hall of Fame during the final table.

Performance of past champions

*-Indicates player who finished in the money

Final Table

*Career statistics prior to the 2019 Main Event

Final Table results

Records
 The Main Event field was the largest since 2006, and the top prize of $10 million was the largest since 2014.
 Event #3: $500 Big 50 No Limit Hold'em became the largest live poker tournament in history with 28,371 entrants, surpassing the previous record of 22,374 held by the Colossus in 2015.
 Jim Bechtel, the 1993 Main Event champion, won Event #21: $10,000 No Limit 2-7 Lowball Draw for his first bracelet since his Main Event win. The 26 years between bracelet wins is the longest in WSOP history.
 Loren Klein won Event #43: $2,500 Mixed Big Bet, becoming the first player since Doyle Brunson from 1976–79 and just the third overall to win bracelets in four straight years.

Notes

References

World Series of Poker
World Series of Poker
World Series of Poker